The Greater Manchester Police Museum is a former police station converted into a museum and archives detailing the history of policing in Greater Manchester, England. It was home to Manchester City Police and then its successors Manchester and Salford Police and Greater Manchester Police from 1879 until 1979.

Upon its conversion to a museum in 1981 the interior was redesigned to reflect its past and now serves as a reminder of Victorian policing. The building was Grade II listed in 1994 as Former Newton Street Police Station.

Location
Located on Newton Street in Manchester's Northern Quarter it is a short walk away from Piccadilly Gardens and Piccadilly railway station.

See also

Listed buildings in Manchester-M1

References

External links
 Official Website

Grade II listed museum buildings
Grade II listed buildings in Manchester
Museums in Manchester
Law enforcement museums in England